Arnold Whiteside  (6 November 1911 – 1994) was an English footballer who played as a wing half in The Football League for Blackburn Rovers.

Club career
Born in Garstang, Lancashire, Whiteside played as a junior for Woodplumpton Juniors before joining Blackburn in 1932. His career was interrupted by World War II and during this conflict he was a member of the Blackburn side which lost the 1940 Football League War Cup Final. Guesting for Liverpool during World War II, Whiteside returned to Blackburn after the war before moving to Wigan Athletic in 1949. He played over 400 times in all competitions for Blackburn. He spent one season at Wigan, appearing 24 times in the league without scoring.

References

1911 births
1994 deaths
Association football midfielders
Blackburn Rovers F.C. players
Liverpool F.C. wartime guest players
Wigan Athletic F.C. players
People from Garstang
Date of death missing
English footballers
English Football League players